Somerset is an unincorporated community in Miami County, Kansas, United States.  As of the 2020 census, the population of the community and nearby areas was 90.

Demographics

For statistical purposes, the United States Census Bureau has defined Somerset as a census-designated place (CDP).

Education
The community is served by Paola USD 368 public school district.

References

Further reading

External links
 Miami County maps: Current, Historic, KDOT

Unincorporated communities in Kansas
Unincorporated communities in Miami County, Kansas